Afrivoluta pringlei, commonly known as the pringle's marginella, is a species of large deep water sea snail with a glossy shell, a marine gastropod mollusc in the family Marginellonidae.

This species is endemic to South Africa, and it is found south-east of Cape Recife in a depth of 220 m. Specimens have been found off Algoa Bay and Jeffreys Bay.

Tomlin called the genus Afrivoluta, and the genotype pringlei, after the director of the Port Elizabeth Museum and Snake Park.

References

Further reading 
 Lipe, R. 1991. Marginellas:37;pl.18, fig 1
 Lorenz 1993. World Shells 4:49

Marginellonidae
Gastropods described in 1947